The Colfax Elementary & Middle School is a public school in Pittsburgh, Pennsylvania, United States. Its building, built in 1911, was listed on the National Register of Historic Places in 1986. As of October 1, 2017, there were a total of 890 students enrolled in the school. The school's Principal is Dr. Tamara Sanders- Woods and the Vice Principal is Joan Murphy (middle school). The school is one of oldest schools still open in the City of Pittsburgh. The school  added a new building with a glass bridge connecting the two buildings, in 2007 circa. The school is under Pittsburgh Public Schools direction, and led by Superintendent Anthony Hamlet.

Proximity and students 
The school presides in the Squirrel Hill neighborhood and attracts students from all over the city mostly including Squirrel Hill and East Hills (Pittsburgh). The school is made up of a lot of students from around the world including Asia, Middle East, Latin America and Africa, there is also a large Jewish population within the school. The school is prominently diverse and also includes the ESL program for non-English speaking students. Most students who attend Colfax K-8 will proceed to Taylor Allderdice to continue into high school.

Events 
The school hosts various events including a carnival celebrations, ice skating, sports events and ballroom dancing, year round. They also raise money through different fundraisers and events including Party 4 Play and their own PTO organization. They also participate in ski club at Seven Springs Mountain Resort, running marathons, musical plays, movie nights, talent shows, VIP Day (involves bringing a parent or close one to school, to see how students are in class) and a variety of other things. The school has won a lot of consecutive awards for the "African American Bowl Challenge", and tons of champion awards in reading and literature.

References

School buildings on the National Register of Historic Places in Pennsylvania
Schools in Pittsburgh
Tudor Revival architecture in Pennsylvania
School buildings completed in 1911
Pittsburgh History & Landmarks Foundation Historic Landmarks
City of Pittsburgh historic designations
National Register of Historic Places in Pittsburgh
1911 establishments in Pennsylvania